Sir Joseph-Philippe-René-Adolphe Caron,  (24 December 1843 – 20 April 1908) was a Canadian lawyer and politician.  He is now best remembered as the Minister of Militia and Defence in the government of Sir John A. Macdonald and his role during the North-West Rebellion of 1885.

He was born in Quebec City in 1843, the son of René-Édouard Caron, and studied at the Petit Séminaire de Québec and McGill College. He was called to the bar in 1865 and entered practice with a law firm in Quebec City, later becoming a partner.  A Conservative party member, Caron was elected six times to the House of Commons of Canada, first winning election in a by-election in 1873, where he won a seat as a Member of Parliament representing the electoral district of Quebec County. He defended this seat in 1874, 1878, 1880, 1882 and 1887. In the 1891 election he was elected as the MP for Rimouski, and in 1896 as the MP for Three Rivers and St. Maurice. From 1892 to 1896 he served as Postmaster General of Canada.

After Caron left politics in 1900, he returned to practising law. He died at Montreal in 1908 after having been ill for several months.

There are Adolphe-Philippe Caron fonds at Library and Archives Canada and Bibliothèque et Archives nationales du Québec.

Electoral record 

By-election: On Mr. Caron being appointed Minister of Militia and Defence, 8 November 1880

References

External links 
 
 

1843 births
1908 deaths
Canadian Knights Commander of the Order of St Michael and St George
French Quebecers
Conservative Party of Canada (1867–1942) MPs
Members of the House of Commons of Canada from Quebec
Members of the King's Privy Council for Canada
Pre-Confederation Quebec people
Lawyers in Quebec
People of the North-West Rebellion